The 1936 Wyoming Cowboys football team was an American football team that represented the University of Wyoming as a member of the Rocky Mountain Conference (RMC) during the 1936 college football season.  In their fourth season under head coach Willard Witte, the Cowboys compiled a 2–5–1 record (2–4–1 against conference opponents), finished in ninth place out of 12 teams in the RMC, and were outscored by a total of 159 to 74.

Schedule

References

Wyoming
Wyoming Cowboys football seasons
Wyoming Cowboys football